Sunei Dam is a dam located in Odisha, India.Sunei Dam is located at latitude 21° 28‘ N, longitude 87° 28’ E, at Salchua Village, about 21 km south of Udala town. The drainage area of Sunei up to the confluence with the Burhabalanga river is nearly 1200 km2, while the catchment area of the dam site is 227 km sq.

Construction 
The Sunei dam was constructed in 1990. The Sunei Medium Irrigation scheme is located in the Northeast of Orissa State, in the Burhabalanga river basin, which outfalls to the Bay of Bengal. The Sono river, a tributary of the Burhabalanga, originates from the Similipal hill range in Mayurbhanj District, travels in the districts of Mayurbhanj meets the river Burhabalanga, after travelling 80 km from its source. The Chief Engineer were C.E. & B.M., S.& B. Basin, Laxmiposi, Baripada

Features 
The Sunei scheme is surrounded with lush green forests, with thick coverage in the Similipal region, thinning towards the periphery. The Similipal National Park and its tiger reserve, and the Similipal-Kuldiha-Hadagarh Elephant Reserve are situated to the north of the scheme. (Both the reserves constitute part of the UNESCO world network of Biosphere Reserve since 2009)  Similarly Devkunda, a divine scenic spot popular with tourists due to its water fall and natural beauty, is situated 25 km from Udala and 3 km from Kaptipada. 
The height of the dam is 30m and the length of the dam 2134m.

Distance
7 km from Kaptiada
14 km from Udala
60 km from Baripada

References 

Dams in India
Dams in Odisha
Dams completed in 1975
20th-century architecture in India